Bee Cave is a city located in Travis County, Texas, United States. Its population was 9,144 as of the 2020 census.

History
Bee Cave was named by early settlers for a large cave of wild bees found near the site. A post office opened there under the name Bee Caves in 1870. The city was incorporated in 1987.

Geography

Bee Cave is located at  (30.305430, –97.952213), about 12 miles west of Austin.

According to the United States Census Bureau in 2010, the city has a total area of 2.6 square miles (6.7 km2), all of it land. It borders Lakeway to the northwest.

Climate 
Bee Cave has a humid, subtropical climate, Cfa in the Köppen climate classification. Generally, the city has long, hot summers and short, cool winters.

Demographics

As of the 2020 United States census, 9,144 people, 3,083 households, and 1,731 families were residing in the city. The population density was 252.0 people per square mile (97.4/km2). The 4044 housing units ad an average density of 94.5/sq mi (36.5/km2). Of the 3,083 households, 50.2% had children under 18 living with them, 79.7% were married couples living together, 2.4% had a female householder with no husband present, and 16.9% were not families. About 9.7% of all households were made up of individuals, and 2.4% had someone living alone who was 65 or older. The average household size was 3.17 and the average family size was 3.38.

In the city, the age distribution was 33.1% under 18, 3.8% from 18 to 24, 34.8% from 25 to 44, 23.2% from 45 to 64, and 5.2% who were 65 or older. The median age was 36 years. For every 100 females, there were 108.9 males. For every 100 females 18 and over, there were 104.2 males.

In 2015, the median income for a household in the city was $129,270, and the median house value was $597,091. Males had a median income of $100,000 versus $59,000 for females. The per capita income for the city was $53,911. None of the families and 2.7% of the population were living below the poverty line, including none under 18 and none over 74.

Economy
American Campus Communities has its headquarters in Buildings T and S in the Hill Country Galleria shopping development, in Bee Cave. The company offices located there in December 2010.

Government and infrastructure

Police
As of 2021, the City of Bee Cave is patrolled by the Bee Cave Police Department under the direction of Chief Brian Jones, a former commander with the Austin Police Department. As of 2017, the department has 20 officers and one civilian clerk.

Education

Bee Cave is served by the Lake Travis Independent School District. Three elementary schools, Bee Cave Elementary School in Bee Cave, Lake Pointe Elementary School in an unincorporated area, and Lakeway Elementary School in Lakeway, serve Bee Cave and sections of Lakeway. Lake Travis Middle School and Bee Cave Middle School serve most of Bee Cave while Hudson Bend Middle School serves portions to the northwest; both schools are in unincorporated areas. Lake Travis High School, in an unincorporated area, serves all of Bee Cave.

Lake Travis Middle School served the entirety of Bee Cave until 2019, when Bee Cave Middle School began operations. It is now served by both schools.

In popular culture

In 2007, the Texas Legislature declared the West Pole of the Earth to be located in Bee Cave.

The canonical birth place of The Engineer (voiced by Grant Goodeve) from Valve's Team Fortress 2 is in Bee Cave.

References

External links

 City of Bee Cave Official Site
 
 Local News Site (BeeCaveBee.com)

Cities in Texas
Cities in Travis County, Texas
Cities in Greater Austin
Populated places established in 1870
Populated places established in 1987
1870 establishments in Texas
1987 establishments in Texas